Tiruvannamalai is a state assembly constituency in Tiruvannamalai district of Tamil Nadu, India. Its State Assembly Constituency number is 63. It comprises portions of the Chengam and Tiruvannamalai taluks and is a part of the similarly named constituency for national elections to the Parliament of India.
Most successful party: DMK (10 times). It is one of the 234 State Legislative Assembly Constituencies in Tamil Nadu, in India.

Madras State

Tamil Nadu

Election results

2021

2016

2011

2006

2001

1996

1991

1989

1984

1980

1977

1971

1967

1963 By-election
P U Shanmugam Wins

1962

1957

1952

References

External links
 

Assembly constituencies of Tamil Nadu
Tiruvannamalai